Cereopsius elongatus is a species of beetle in the family Cerambycidae. It was described by Stephan von Breuning and de Jong in 1941. It is known from Sumatra and Java.

References

Cereopsius
Beetles described in 1941